The 1983 NCAA Division II Soccer Championship was the 12th annual tournament held by the NCAA to determine the top men's Division II college soccer program in the United States.

Seattle Pacific defeated Tampa in the final, 1–0, to win their second Division II national title. The Falcons (16-4-1), who previously won in 1978, were coached by Cliff McCrath.

The final match was played on December 2 at Pepin-Rood Stadium on the campus of the University of Tampa in Tampa, Florida.

Bracket

Final

See also  
 NCAA Division I Men's Soccer Championship
 NCAA Division III Men's Soccer Championship
 NAIA Men's Soccer Championship

References 

NCAA Division II Men's Soccer Championship
NCAA Division II Men's Soccer Championship
NCAA Division II Men's Soccer Championship
NCAA Division II Men's Soccer Championship